Singapore will participate at the 2023 Southeast Asian Games held in Phnom Penh, Cambodia from 5 May to 17 May 2023. 
This will be the first time Cambodia is hosting the biennial Games.

Competitors
A total of 516* athletes have been preliminary selected to represent Singapore. They will be competing across 27 sports.  

On 28 February, a further 56 athletes have been selected following appeals to the Singapore National Olympic Council (SNOC). The final tally stands at 572 athletes competing in 30/37 sports.  However, Singapore’s Olympic Champion Joseph Schooling is not among the athletes heading to the Games after he withdrew following the initial selection.  No athlete will be fielded in Bodybuilding, Bokator, Jetski, Obstacle Race, Petanque, Sepak Takraw and Weightlifting.

Medal Summary

References

Southeast Asian Games
2023